Sodium ascorbate is one of a number of mineral salts of ascorbic acid (vitamin C). The molecular formula of this chemical compound is C6H7NaO6. As the sodium salt of ascorbic acid, it is known as a mineral ascorbate. It has not been demonstrated to be more bioavailable than any other form of vitamin C supplement.

Sodium ascorbate normally provides 131 mg of sodium per 1,000 mg of ascorbic acid (1,000 mg of sodium ascorbate contains 889 mg of ascorbic acid and 111 mg of sodium).

As a food additive, it has the E number E301 and is used as an antioxidant and an acidity regulator. It is approved for use as a food additive in the EU, USA, Australia, and New Zealand.

In in vitro studies, sodium ascorbate has been found to produce cytotoxic effects in various malignant cell lines, which include melanoma cells that are particularly susceptible.

Production
Sodium ascorbate is produced by dissolving ascorbic acid in water and adding an equivalent amount of sodium bicarbonate in water.  After cessation of effervescence, the sodium ascorbate is precipitated by the addition of isopropanol.

References

External links
 The Bioavailability of Different Forms of Vitamin C

Ascorbates
Food additives
Organic sodium salts
Vitamers
Vitamin C
E-number additives